Season four of Seinfeld, an American comedy television series created by Jerry Seinfeld and Larry David, began airing on August 12, 1992, and concluded on May 20, 1993, on NBC.

Production
Seinfeld was produced by Castle Rock Entertainment and distributed by Columbia Pictures Television and Columbia TriStar Television and was aired on NBC in the US. The executive producers were Larry David, George Shapiro, and Howard West with Tom Gammill and Max Pross as supervising producers. Bruce Kirschbaum was the executive consultant. This season was directed by Tom Cherones and was largely written by Larry David, Jerry Seinfeld, Larry Charles, Peter Mehlman and Andy Robin.

The series was set predominantly in an apartment block on New York City's Upper West Side; however, the fourth season was shot and filmed predominantly in CBS Studio Center in Studio City, California. The show features Jerry Seinfeld as himself, and a host of Jerry's friends and acquaintances, which include George Costanza, Elaine Benes, and Kramer, portrayed by Jason Alexander, Julia Louis-Dreyfus and Michael Richards, respectively.

Story arcs
The season had numerous story arcs. One that spanned the whole season involved Jerry and George trying to make a TV pilot for NBC. Another was George having a relationship with former NBC executive Susan Ross. In another, Joe Davola stalked and attacked the show's principal characters.

Reception

Critical reception
The review aggregator website Rotten Tomatoes reported a 100% approval rating with an average rating of 9/10, based on 13 critic reviews. The website's critics consensus reads, "The show about nothing tries on an overarching plot for a change and yields a riotous satire on television in the process, further solidifying its claim as master of the sitcom domain with observant humor mined from the mundane and uncomfortable." TV Guide named it #1 on their list of the greatest TV seasons. Jamie Malanowski of Time named it the best season of the series saying "A mix of high and low, of the self-referential and the hip, of things underfoot and out of left field."

Nielsen ratings
Season four was ranked No. 25 according to the Nielsen ratings system, with 12,754,700 estimated audience.

Awards and nominations
Season four received eleven Emmy nominations, three of which were won. The show won its first and only Emmy Award for Outstanding Comedy Series. Larry David won the Emmy for Outstanding Writing in a Comedy Series for the episode "The Contest". Michael Richards won his first out of three Emmy Awards for Outstanding Supporting Actor in a Comedy Series. Jerry Seinfeld was nominated for Outstanding Lead Actor in a Comedy Series. Jason Alexander was nominated for Outstanding Supporting Actor in a Comedy Series. Julia Louis-Dreyfus was nominated for Outstanding Supporting Actress in a Comedy Series. Tom Cherones was nominated for Outstanding Directing in a Comedy Series for "The Contest". Larry Charles was nominated for Outstanding Writing in a Comedy Series. Other nominees where Outstanding Achievement in Editing for a Comedy Series for The Airport. Jason Alexander was nominated in the Golden Globe Award in the category for Best Performance by a Supporting Role in a Series, Mini-Series or Motion Picture for TV. This season won a Directors Guild of America (Tom Cherones) for "The Contest", and a Writers Guild of America (Larry David) for "The Contest".

Crossover
In the seventh episode of the first season of Mad About You, which aired on November 11, 1992, Kramer sublets his apartment from a main character. When he asks about Jerry, Kramer tells him about the NBC show.

Episodes

References

External links

 
 
 

4
1992 American television seasons
1993 American television seasons